The Pazmany Aircraft Corporation is an American aircraft design and manufacturing company. The company provides plans for the PL-2, PL-4 and PL-9 for the homebuilder market.

History
The company was founded as L. Pazmany & Associates at San Diego, California to produce the PL-1 single-seat light aircraft designed by Ladislao Pazmany. The PL-1 was followed by the two-seat PL-2. The PL-4 is a single-seat trainer. The latest aircraft is Pazmany PL-9 Stork a high-wing two-seat monoplane for the home builder market, it is a 3/4 scale homebuilders version of the Second World War Fiesler Storch.

Aircraft

References

Notes

Bibliography

External links
 

Aircraft manufacturers of the United States
Manufacturing companies based in California
Companies based in San Diego
Vehicle manufacturing companies established in 1957
Technology companies established in 1957